Ancestral Homeland is the fourth album by American jazz trumpeter Roy Campbell, the second by Pyramid Trio, and the first by the original lineup with bassist William Parker and drummer Zen Matsuura. The album was recorded and released in 1998 on No More. According to Campbell, "the music of the Pyramid Trio is based on World Universal Music, composed and improvised". "Song for Alan" is dedicated to jazz trumpeter Alan Shorter, while "Brother Yusef" is a tribute to Campbell's teacher Yusef Lateef.

Reception

The AllMusic review by Scott Yanow states "each listen to these performances reveals more secrets and shows how well these three master players communicate with each other".

The Down Beat review by Jon Andrews says that the album "frequently brings Don Cherry's work to mind. Campbell's tart, somewhat terse playing on trumpet and pocket trumpet, suggest Cherry, as do the world-music influences that color the trio's performances."

Track listing
All compositions by Roy Campbell except as indicated
 "Song for Alan" - 11:42 
 "Ancestral Homeland" - 11:56 
 "The Positive Path"- 14:35 
 "Oglala Eclipse" (William Parker)- 9:20 
 "Bean Dance" (William Parker)- 5:08 
 "Brother Yusef (intro)" - 3:26 
 "Brother Yusef" - 6:10
 "Camel Caravan" - 10:26

Personnel
Roy Campbell - trumpet, flugelhorn, pocket trumpet, argol, recorder, wood flute, percussion
William Parker - bass, percussion
Zen Matsuura - drums, gong, percussion

References

Roy Campbell Jr. albums
1998 albums